Project: Starfighter is a 2D shoot 'em up written by Parallel Realities (Stephen J Sweeney). It is a mission and objective based game also featuring an intricate plot. The game was later released by Sweeney as Freeware and the engine's source code was opened to the public. The game is now maintained and updated by the game's community as Free and open-source software.

Gameplay 
The game is non linear allowing the player to choose the order of the missions they will undertake in the system. The player's craft can also be upgraded with a choice of secondary weapons and ability to powerup the main plasma cannons.

It also features computer controlled wingmates who assist players in battle.  If the wingmate's craft is destroyed the wingmate will eject and be available in the next mission. Some missions however stipulate that the wingmate must not be allowed to be killed.

Plot
In the future, a weapons corporation known as WEAPCO has dominated the known galaxy with their AI driven starfighters. Under the rule of WEAPCO people begin to suffer and perish. A young rebel pilot called Chris Bainfield makes it his duty to free his home star system, known as Spirit, of WEAPCO's control. He hires a mercenary known as Krass Tyler to steal a Firefly starfighter for him. Along with his close friend, Sid Wilson, Chris begins his mission to fight in to Sol and take down the WEAPCO empire. After preventing a WEAPCO frigate from causing Spirit to supernova he begins the liberation of a number of slaves, including Phoebe Lexx who joins him in his quest. Shortly thereafter the pair are lured into a trap set by Kline Kethlan, the commander of WEAPCO's forces. Bainfield dog fights Kethlan who escapes just before Bainfield can destroy his starfighter.

Resuming their journey towards Sol, the three allies rescue Phoebe's twin sister, Ursula, before they are attacked by Krass Tyler. The mercenary informs them that it is nothing personal and that he has been paid off by WEAPCO to eliminate the team. Eventually the group arrive at Earth where they battle for control of the planet.

With WEAPCO overthrown Bainfield chases Kethlan to Venus where he begs the commander to surrender, so that he does not have to kill him. Kethlan refuses and informs Bainfield that he would prefer to die a warrior's death. The two dog fight for one last time, with Bainfield emerging as the victor.

Development history 
Project: Starfighter was originally developed for the Amiga, and the source code was available as freeware (allowing only non-commercial usage) in the early 2000s. On 7 March 2002 the game was released for Linux too, and the source code was released under non-commercial terms. On 18 April 2004 the game become available for Debian and the GPL license was linked for the complete Parallel Realities website.

Project: Starfighter has been ported later to many platforms, including Linux, FreeBSD, Mac OS X, Microsoft Windows, Sony PSP, Amiga OS4, QNX and Xbox.

A continuation of Project Starfighter exists, where the original Freeware game assets were replaced by various Open content artwork (mostly CC BY and CC BY-SA licensed) in 2012 and 2015. The project moved in 2015 from SourceForge to GNU Savannah, and then moved to GitHub with the release of version 2.0 in 2019.

The project continues to be updated under the GNU GPL version 3 or later.

Novelization
In June 2014, Sweeney published a novelization of the story of Project: Starfighter, making it the first time a commercial novel has been based on a GPL video game. The story retains much of the plot of the original game, while also expanding on a number of aspects of the universe. Key characters from the game - Chris Bainfield, Sid Wilson, Kline Kethlan, Krass Tyler, and Phoebe and Ursula Lexx - are all given prominent roles, while WEAPCO is presented as the "Wade Ellen Asset Protection Corporation" (by way of a backronym). The most substantial change was that the starfighter itself that Chris flew during the game is now sentient in the book. The fighter goes by the name of Athena. Athena plays a large role in the story, and helps Chris in his fight back against WEAPCO. While piloting the Firefly, Athena is able to merge her mind with Chris', allowing him to increase his perception of the world and react much faster than an ordinary human pilot. The speed at which he learns to master flight and combat in the Firefly also increases significantly, with Chris becoming a legendary pilot in a matter of only a few days.

See also

 The Honour of the Knights

References

Further reading
 Magnus "MdaG" Olsson, Project Starfighter review, reloaded.org
 JuegaLinEx: más de 140 juegos compatibles con GNU-Linux, Chapter 31, Page 90
 Linux Format, March 2003, Hot Pick

External links
 Project: Starfighter homepage on GitHub
 Project: Starfighter on SourceForge
 Parallel Realities Homepage

Linux games
2001 video games
AmigaOS 4 games
MacOS games
MorphOS games
Shoot 'em ups
Open-source video games
PlayStation Portable games
Novels based on video games
Libre art
Creative Commons-licensed video games
Video games developed in the United Kingdom
Windows games
Xbox games